The 1897 County Championship was the eighth officially organised running of the County Championship, and ran from 3 May to 30 August 1897. Lancashire County Cricket Club won the championship for the first time, narrowly beating Surrey.

Table
 One point was awarded for a win, and one point was taken away for each loss. Final placings were decided by dividing the number of points earned by the number of completed matches (i.e. those that ended in win or loss), and multiplying by 100.

Leading averages

References

External links

1897 in English cricket
County Championship seasons
County